The House Subcommittee on General Farm Commodities, Risk Management and Credit is a subcommittee within the House Agriculture Committee.

It is currently chaired by Republican Austin Scott of Georgia.

Jurisdiction
Policies, statutes, and markets relating to commodities including barley, cotton, cottonseed, corn, grain sorghum, honey, mohair, oats, other oilseeds, peanuts, pulse crops, rice, soybeans, sugar, wheat, and wool; the Commodity Credit Corporation; risk management policies and statutes, including Federal Crop Insurance; producer data and privacy issues; agricultural credit; and related oversight of such issues.

Specialty crops, such as peanuts, sugar, and tobacco, which were previously handled by the Subcommittee on Specialty Crops, Rural Development and Foreign Agriculture were added to the subcommittee's jurisdiction during the 112th Congress.

Members, 118th Congress

Historical membership rosters

117th Congress

116th Congress

115th Congress

References

External links
 Subcommittee page

Agriculture General Farm Commodities and Risk Management